Ylena In-Albon (born 6 March 1999) is a Swiss tennis player.

She has career-high WTA rankings of 110 in singles, achieved on 6 June 2022, and 225 in doubles, set on 3 February 2020.

Career
In-Albon made her main-draw debut on the WTA Tour at the 2017 Ladies Open Biel Bienne in the doubles draw, partnering fellow Swiss player Leonie Küng.

She made her debut in a Grand Slam main draw as a direct entry at the 2022 Wimbledon Championships, replacing Sofia Kenin.

Grand Slam singles performance timeline

ITF Circuit finals

Singles: 20 (12 titles, 8 runner–ups)

Doubles: 19 (8 titles, 11 runner–ups)

Notes

References

External links
 
 

1999 births
Living people
Swiss female tennis players
People from Visp (district)